Martin Julian Buerger (April 8, 1903 – February 26, 1986) was an American crystallographer. He was a Professor of Mineralogy at the Massachusetts Institute of Technology. He invented the X-ray precession camera for studies in crystallography.  Buerger authored twelve textbooks/monographs and over 200 technical articles. He was awarded the Arthur L. Day Medal by the Geological Society of America in 1951. The mineral fluor-buergerite was named for him.  The MJ Buerger Award (established by the American Crystallographic Association) was established in his honor.

Buerger was a member of the Provisional International Crystallographic Committee chaired by P. P. Ewald from 1946 to 1948, and he continued as a member of the IUCr Executive Committee from 1948 to 1951. He was also a member of the Commission on International Tables from its establishment in 1948 until 1981.

In 1956, Buerger was the third person (after John C. Slater and Francis O. Schmitt) to have been appointed Institute Professor at MIT.

Significant works

Crystal-Structure Analysis, 668pp, Krieger Pub Co., 1979
Introduction to crystal geometry, 204pp., R. E. Krieger, 1977
Contemporary crystallography, 364pp., McGraw Hill, 1970
Elementary crystallography;: An introduction to the fundamental geometrical features of crystals, 528pp., Wiley, 1963
X-ray crystallography;: An introduction to the investigation of crystals by their diffraction of monochromatic X radiation, 531pp., Chapman & Hall, 1958

References
Memorial, American Mineralogist, Volume 73, pages 1483-1485, 1988
Description and photograph of Buergerite
 Obituary from the Journal of Applied Crystallography, 1986
Obituary from the New York Times

1903 births
1986 deaths
American mineralogists
Members of the United States National Academy of Sciences